211 North Ervay is a high rise located at 211 North Ervay Street in the City Center District of Dallas, Texas, United States. The building rises  and contains 18 floors of office space. The colorful building of modernist design is situated on a prominent city corner and adjacent to Thanks-Giving Square.

History
211 North Ervay was designed by architects Hedrick & Stanley for developer Leo Corrigan as his fourth major downtown office building (after the Corrigan Tower, Burt Tower and Adolphus Tower). Adjacent to the structure was the Palace Theater, one of many on Elm Street's historic Theater Row.

The building's facade was covered with continuous glass windows along with alternating azure and aquamarine porcelain spandrels. The colorful design was a popular way to add color to otherwise bland urban skylines of the mid-twentieth century. The ground floor, containing the main entrance on Ervay, was covered in granite and recessed to provide extra sidewalk width for street level retail space; the second floor was covered in mosaics. Opened in 1958 as a general office building, it was popular with insurance companies, law firms, and aviation-related companies.

The building was sold in 1971 and 1977; the second sale resulted in a complete remodeling of the lobby, elevators and changes in the exterior facade of the first two levels. Over successive years occupancy rates slowly declined as modern skyscrapers such as 1700 Pacific, Thanksgiving Tower and Comerica Bank Tower surrounded the building. The building was sold again in 1986, and by 1995 it was completely vacant. Labeled an eyesore, in 2004 Dallas Mayor Laura Miller campaigned to have the building demolished for a downtown park. In response, Preservation Dallas included the building in its inaugural list of Dallas’ Most Endangered Historic Places, citing its importance in the National Register's Dallas Downtown Historic District and an example of the vanishing "cool blue" architecture of the 1950s.

In 2005 3J Development purchased the building and planned to convert the building into residential units. The renovation plan, abandoned in 2007, would have altered the facade and removed the distinctive blue panels. The structure was one of seven downtown buildings targeted by Dallas Mayor Tom Leppert for numerous code and fire hazards in 2009, resulting in a cleanup of the ground floor and updated safety systems. After failed redevelopment plans, efforts to demolish the building were renewed in 2012 when it was reported the building may be purchased and donated to the City of Dallas. Recommendations from an updated Downtown Dallas Parks Master Plan may call for removal of the building, but the high cost of demolition and abatement may influence the outcome. Until that time, 211 North Ervay will remain a colorful landmark in the heart of downtown Dallas.

The downtown building has been vacant for almost 20 years, but developer Mike Sarimsakci Managing Partner of Alto / Alterra has been working to redevelop the building since December 2012. Groups and companies have already claimed eight floors Crawford said. Dallas nonprofit Linking the World will move into the building July 1 and three tenants will fill slots on the ground floor: a furniture retailer, a restaurant/bistro/coffee shop and another retailer which Crawford could not discuss. Sarimsakci is expected to take the top floor for his own offices and living space.

Developer and investor Mike Sarimsakci of Alto / Alterra said Alto 211's central location has attracted dozens of innovative companies as tenants, including several tech startups, law firms, media companies, nonprofits and others. “We think of this building as an entrepreneurial hub and a sort of high-tech mecca in downtown Dallas,” said Sarimsakci.

Sarimsakci said he ultimately sees the project as an investment in Dallas’ larger economy. “It’s not that we just finished the building using historic tax credits; we brought it back to life in a very positive way,” he said. “We have dynamic tenants creating new technologies, new jobs and new companies.

In May 2014, FORBES Top 10 Business Accelerator Tech Wildcatters announced that it would be leasing 18,000 square feet in the Ervay building, marking a renaissance for this historic piece of downtown Dallas.

In September 2014, Fort Work announced plans to relocate its coworking home from North Dallas to the Ervay building.

References

External links
 211 North Ervay on Emporis
 History of 211 North Ervay, Dallas Public Library
 2007 Real Estate Listing
Photo of structure from Pacific Avenue
Photo of structure's Ervay Street frontage

Skyscraper office buildings in Dallas
Office buildings completed in 1958
Buildings and structures in Dallas
Modernist architecture in Texas